Heinsia crinita (commonly known as bush apple) is a species of perennial shrub or small tree in the family, Rubiaceae. It is native to tropical areas of Africa.

The fruit is harvested as a local source of food and the leaves are also eaten ("betete" or bitter leaves). Parts are also used in traditional medicine. It has been the subject of various studies. It is known as atama in Nigeria.

References

Flora of Nigeria
Flora of Somalia
Flora of Guinea
Flora of Zimbabwe
Medicinal plants
Flora of Sierra Leone
Flora of Angola
Flora of Mozambique
Mussaendeae